Sing Out for Ireland is the fourteenth album by Irish folk and rebel band The Wolfe Tones.

Track list 
 Flight of Earls
 Croppy Boy
 The Impartial Police Force
 Janey Mac, I'm Nearly Forty
 Carolan's Favorite
 The Guilford Four
 Annabell
 St. Patrick's Day
 Radio Toor-I-La-Ay
 Paddy's Night Out
 Great Fenian Ram
 Bonny Mary of Argyle
 Kiss the Old Mother, Hug the Old Man
 A Soldier's Song

The Wolfe Tones albums
1987 albums